Düsseldorf-Benrath station is about 10 kilometres south of Düsseldorf Hauptbahnhof in the Düsseldorf district of Benrath. It is on the Cologne–Duisburg line, and is classified by Deutsche Bahn as a category 3 station. In addition, Düsseldorf Benrath station is served by two Regional-Express services, several city bus services  and two Stadtbahn lines. Benrath is the busiest station after Düsseldorf Hauptbahnhof in Düsseldorf with about 25,000–30,000 daily entries and exits.

On 23 January 1998, the station was heritage-listed by the city of Düsseldorf in the category of technical monuments.

History

In 1843, the Prussian Ministry of Finance gave the Cologne-Minden Railway Company permission to build a railway line from Cologne via Düsseldorf to Minden. Shares were put on sale to finance this project and many people from Benrath bought these shares on the understanding that Benrath would have a station on the new line. On 20 December 1845, the first section opened between Deutz and Duisburg and Benrath station was officially opened.

In 1907, Benrath already handled over 250,000 passengers. The current station building dates from 1932 and replaced the original station. This old station was demolished, because it had become too small for the number of passengers using it and because raising  the entire four-track railway line by 2.5 metres allowed a bridge to be over the street.

On 25 May 1965 Queen Elizabeth II visited Benrath and was received by the then Minister-President of North Rhine-Westphalia Franz Meyers at the station, which had been decorated for the occasion.

Current situation 
The station is located in a central location between the districts of Düsseldorf-Benrath, Düsseldorf-Urdenbach and Düsseldorf-Garath. It is elevated above Hildener Straße, from which there is access via a tunnel. In addition, both tracks are equipped with lifts. There is parking on both the western and the eastern sides of the station.

The station has two central platforms  between the four tracks of the Cologne–Duisburg line. Two Regional-Express services stop at the long-distance platform, while Intercity and Intercity-Express trains past the platform at 200 km/h without stopping.

Train services 
Regional-Express lines RE 1 and RE 5 stop at the station every hour and line S 6 stops at 20-minute intervals. It is also served by Stadtbahn lines 71 and 83, six bus lines and three night express bus lines.

The station is served by the following services:

Regional services  NRW-Express Aachen - Cologne - Düsseldorf - Duisburg - Essen - Dortmund - Hamm - Paderborn
Regional services  Rhein-Express Emmerich - Wesel - Oberhausen - Duisburg - Düsseldorf - Cologne - Bonn - Koblenz
Rhein-Ruhr S-Bahn services  Essen - Kettwig - Düsseldorf - Cologne - Köln-Nippes
Rhein-Ruhr S-Bahn services  Langenfeld - Düsseldorf - Wuppertal-Vohwinkel

References 

Railway stations in Düsseldorf
Rhine-Ruhr S-Bahn stations
S6 (Rhine-Ruhr S-Bahn)
S68 (Rhine-Ruhr S-Bahn)
Düsseldorf VRR stations
Railway stations in Germany opened in 1845